The cabinet of Constantin Angelescu was the government of Romania from 30 December 1933 to 3 January 1934.

Ministers
The ministers of the cabinet were as follows:

President of the Council of Ministers:
Constantin Angelescu (30 December 1933 - 3 January 1934)
Minister of the Interior:
Ion Inculeț (30 December 1933 - 3 January 1934)
Minister of Foreign Affairs: 
Nicolae Titulescu (30 December 1933 - 3 January 1934)
Minister of Finance:
Constantin I. C. Brătianu (30 December 1933 - 3 January 1934)
Minister of Justice:
Victor Antonescu (30 December 1933 - 3 January 1934)
Minister of Public Instruction, Religious Affairs, and the Arts:
Constantin Angelescu (30 December 1933 - 3 January 1934)
Minister of National Defence:
Gen. Nicolae Uică (30 December 1933 - 3 January 1934)
Minister of Agriculture and Property
Gheorghe Cipăianu (30 December 1933 - 3 January 1934)
Minister of Industry and Commerce:
Gheorghe Tătărăscu (30 December 1933 - 3 January 1934)
Minister of Labour, Health, and Social Security:
Constantin D. Dimitriu (30 December 1933 - 3 January 1934)
Minister of Public Works and Communications:
Richard Franasovici (30 December 1933 - 3 January 1934)

Ministers of State:
Ion Nistor (30 December 1933 - 3 January 1934)
Alexandru Lapedatu (30 December 1933 - 3 January 1934)

References

Cabinets of Romania
Cabinets established in 1933
Cabinets disestablished in 1934
1933 establishments in Romania
1934 disestablishments in Romania